Catherine or Katherine Gordon may refer to:

Lady Catherine Gordon (c. 1474–1537), Scottish noblewoman who became a lady-in-waiting in England
Catherine Gordon (c. 1725–1779), daughter of William Gordon, 2nd Earl of Aberdeen
Catherine Gordon (fl. 1770–1811), mother of the poet George Gordon Byron, 6th Baron Byron, usually known as Lord Byron
Katherine C. Gordon (1917–2011), American astronomer
Katherine L. Gordon, Canadian poet
Cathy Gordon Brown (born 1965), American politician

See also 
 Kate Gordon (disambiguation)